Rudolf Wild (25 February 1904 in Wiesloch, Baden – 16 September 1995 in Eppelheim) was a German entrepreneur, and the founder of WILD, a producer of natural ingredients for food products and beverages.

Biography
After studying chemistry in Heidelberg, Frankfurt and Freiburg, in 1931, Rudolf Wild founded his first company – Zick Zack Werk Rudolf Wild. He set the goal of producing basic materials for non-alcoholic drinks using only natural raw materials.

He presented the first completely natural alcohol-free drink, with no artificial flavorings, preservatives or colorings under the brand Libella at the Interbrau trade fair in 1951. Although Rudolf Wild initially received a skeptical response from customers, his philosophy eventually won recognition as a quality characteristic throughout the beverage and food industries.

Under his leadership, WILD developed into an international company. The company is now owned and operated by one of his sons, Hans-Peter Wild.

Social involvement
Rudolf Wild concentrated on the well-being of his employees while also supporting the citizens of his hometown of Eppelheim – for example, with his generous donation for the construction of a community center.

Awards
In 1979, Rudolf Wild was named the first honorary citizen of the Eppelheim district in recognition of his services to both the citizens and the district. He was also awarded the Stauffer Medal, the highest award of the state of Baden-Württemberg, in the same year.

Rudolf Wild received the honorary medal of the Ruprecht-Karls University Heidelberg for his many years of support for the university both financially and in idea generation, and became an honorary member in 1994. The Maison Internationale des Intellectuels (M.I.D.I.) awarded Rudolf Wild the honor of Senator h. c. in 1985.

To mark his 85th birthday in 1989, Rudolf Wild was awarded the Verdienstkreuz mit Stern (Great Cross of Merit with Star) for his life's work by the then Ministerpräsident of Baden-Württemberg, Lothar Späth. The Verdienstkreuz mit Stern is the highest award issued by the Federal Republic of Germany.

External links
 WILD webpage

1904 births
1995 deaths
People from Wiesloch
People from the Grand Duchy of Baden
Businesspeople from Heidelberg
Knights Commander of the Order of Merit of the Federal Republic of Germany
20th-century German businesspeople